The 2018 African Handball Cup Winners' Cup was the 24th edition, organized by the African Handball Confederation, under the auspices of the International Handball Federation, the handball sport governing body. The tournament was held from April 13–22, 2018 and took place in Cairo, Egypt, contested by 14 teams and won by Al Ahly SC of Egypt.

Draw

Preliminary rounds

Times given below are in EET (UTC+2).

Group A

* Note:  Advance to quarter-finals Relegated to 9th classification

Group B

* Note:  Advance to quarter-finals Relegated to 9th classification

Group C

* Note:  Advance to quarter-finals Relegated to 9th classification

Group D

* Note:  Advance to quarter-finals Relegated to 9th classification

Knockout stage

13th place match

Championship bracket

5-8th bracket

9-12th place

Final standings

Awards

See also 
2018 African Handball Champions League

References

External links 
 CAHB official website

African Handball Cup Winners' Cup
2018 in African handball
2018 in Egyptian sport
International handball competitions hosted by Egypt
April 2018 sports events in Egypt